The 2022 Summit League softball tournament took place from May 12–15, 2022. It was initially scheduled to begin on May 11 but was postponed due to severe weather. The top six regular-season finishers of the league's eight teams met in the double-elimination tournament at Jackrabbit Softball Stadium on the campus of South Dakota State University in Brookings, South Dakota. The winner of the tournament, South Dakota State, earned the Summit League's automatic bid to the 2022 NCAA Division I softball tournament. After weather delays and power outages on South Dakota State's campus on May 13, the remaining games in the tournament were moved to Nygaard Field on the campus of the University of South Dakota in Vermillion, South Dakota.

Standings

 St. Thomas and Western Illinois did not participate in the tournament
 St. Thomas is ineligible for postseason play through 2026
Reference:

Format and Seeding
The top six finishers from the regular season were seeded one through six based on conference winning percentage during the conference's regular season. The tournament played out as a modified double-elimination tournament, with the bottom four seeds playing each other in the single-elimination first round and the rest of the tournament as a double-elimination.

Schedule

All-Tournament Team
The following players were named to the All-Tournament Team:

References

Summit League softball
2022 NCAA Division I softball season
2022 Summit League softball season